Paquin is a surname, and may refer to:

Anna Paquin (born 1982), New Zealand actress
Ethan Paquin (born 1975), American poet
Laurent Paquin (born 1971), Canadian comedian and talk show host
Jeanne Paquin (1869–1936), French fashion designer
Leo Paquin (1910–1993), American football player
Luke Paquin (born 1978), American rock guitarist
Marie-Thérèse Paquin (1905–1997), Canadian concert pianist and professor
Mélanie Paquin (born 1981), Canadian beauty pageant winner
Patricia Paquin (born 1968), Canadian actress

French-language surnames